The 1985 European Tour was the 14th official season of golf tournaments known as the PGA European Tour.

The season was made up of 26 tournaments counting for the Order of Merit, and some non-counting "Approved Special Events".

The Order of Merit was won by Scotland's Sandy Lyle, who won twice during the season including his first major, The Open Championship. Spain's Seve Ballesteros finished third on the money list despite recording four official tournament wins, including the French and Spanish Opens.

Changes for 1985
There were several changes from the previous season, with the GSI L'Equipe Open replacing the Timex Open; the return of the British Masters and the Bob Hope Classic, which was rebranded as the Four Stars National Pro-Celebrity; and the loss of the Tournament Players Championship and the Celtic International.

In addition, the Dunhill Cup, a new team event devised by Mark McCormack and held over the Old Course at St Andrews, was added to the schedule but did not count towards the Order of Merit; with a prize fund of US$1.2 million it was the richest tournament in the world, surpassing the Million Dollar Challenge in South Africa.

Rule changes
In 1985, the European Tour became "All-Exempt", meaning that for the first time tournaments did not have their own pre-qualifying rounds. The final two rounds of all major tournaments were played as two-balls, having previously been three-balls.

Schedule
The following table lists official events during the 1985 season.

Unofficial events
The following events were sanctioned by the European Tour, but did not carry official money, nor were wins official.

Order of Merit
The Order of Merit was based on prize money won during the season, calculated in Pound sterling.

Awards

See also
List of golfers with most European Tour wins

Notes

References

External links
1985 season results on the PGA European Tour website
1985 Order of Merit on the PGA European Tour website

European Tour seasons
European Tour